In mathematics, Pieri's formula, named after Mario Pieri, describes the product of a Schubert cycle by a special Schubert cycle in the Schubert calculus, or the product of a Schur polynomial by a complete symmetric function.

In terms of Schur functions sλ indexed by partitions λ, it states that

where hr is a complete homogeneous symmetric polynomial and the sum is over all partitions λ obtained from μ by adding r elements, no two in the same column.
By applying the ω involution on the ring of symmetric functions, one obtains the dual Pieri rule
for multiplying an elementary symmetric polynomial with a Schur polynomial:

The sum is now taken over all partitions λ obtained from μ by adding r elements, no two in the same row.

Pieri's formula implies Giambelli's formula. The Littlewood–Richardson rule is a generalization of Pieri's formula 
giving the product of any two Schur functions. Monk's formula is an analogue of Pieri's formula for flag manifolds.

References

Symmetric functions